William Franklin "Lovebird" Allen (January 19, 1883 – June 14, 1946) was an American businessman and politician. He was a Democratic member of the Delaware General Assembly and the United States House of Representatives.

Early life and family
Allen was born in Bridgeville, Delaware, son of William Franklin (Frank) Allen and Mollie (Smith) Allen. He moved to Seaford, Sussex County, Delaware with his family in 1889, and then to Laurel, Delaware in 1903. He married Addie M. Davis on April 16, 1905 and they had three children, Robert, Franklin, and Doris. They belonged to the Methodist Church.

After completing school in 1902, Allen worked for the Pennsylvania Railroad as an agent, telegrapher, and train dispatcher. In 1922, he returned to Seaford, Delaware, began a real estate business, and also formed a business buying and selling fruit and produce along the Delmarva Peninsula. In 1927, Allen diversified his businesses, and founded the Allen Petroleum Corporation and the Allen Package Company.

Political career
Allen was a public school commissioner in Seaford from 1920 until 1924, and was a delegate to the Democratic National Convention in 1920.

Allen was elected to the State Senate in 1924. He served in the Senate from 1925 to 1929, serving as President pro tempore in 1927

A strong supporter of U.S. President Franklin D. Roosevelt and the New Deal, Allen was elected to the U.S. House of Representatives in 1936, defeating incumbent Republican U.S. Representative J. George Stewart. Allen lost his bid for a second term in 1938 to Republican George S. Williams, a businessman from Millsboro, Delaware. During his term, Allen was a member of the Democratic majority in the 75th Congress and served from January 3, 1937 until January 3, 1939, during the second administration of U.S. President Franklin D. Roosevelt.

Subsequently, he resumed his work in the oil and gasoline distribution business. In 1940, he challenged both major parties and ran for the U.S. Senate as an Independent "Liberal Democrat," but received only a small number of votes.

Death
Allen died at Lewes and is interred at the Odd Fellows Cemetery in Seaford, Delaware.

Electoral history
Elections are held the first Tuesday after November 1. Members of the Delaware General Assembly take office the second Tuesday of January. The State Senate has a four-year term. U.S. Representatives take office January 3 and have a two-year term.

Further reading

References

External links
Biographical Directory of the United States Congress 
Delaware's Members of Congress 

The Political Graveyard 
William F. Allen Scrapbooks, 1830-1946

Places with more information
Delaware Historical Society; website; 505 North Market Street, Wilmington, Delaware 19801; (302) 655-7161
University of Delaware; Library website; 181 South College Avenue, Newark, Delaware 19717; (302) 831-2965

1883 births
1946 deaths
Methodists from Delaware
People from Bridgeville, Delaware
20th-century American businesspeople
Dispatchers
Burials in Sussex County, Delaware
Democratic Party members of the United States House of Representatives from Delaware
20th-century American politicians
People from Seaford, Delaware
People from Laurel, Delaware